Gavin Fernandes, CAS, is a re-recording mixer based in Montreal, Quebec. He is a member of the Academy of Canadian Cinema and Television, the American Academy of Television and the Cinema Audio Society (CAS).

Recognition 
 2022 Can. Screen Award Best Achievement in Overall Sound - Brain Freeze - Nominated (Shared with Pierre Bertrand, Jocelyn Caron, Giuseppe Petrella)
 2020 Can. Screen Award Best Achievement in Overall Sound - Jouliks - Nominated (Shared with Normand Lapierre)
 2017 Emmy Award Best Achievement in Overall Sound - Big Little Lies - Nominated (Shared with Louis Gignac, Brendan Beebe)
 2017 CAS Award Best Achievement in Sound Mixing - Big Little Lies - Nominated (Shared with Louis Gignac, Brendan Beebe)
 2016 Iris Award Best Achievement in Overall Sound - Bon Cop, Bad Cop - Nominated (Shared with Louis Gignac)
 2009 Jutra Award for Best Achievement in Overall Sound - Babine - Won (Shared with Olivier Calvert, Louis Gignac, Dominique Chartrand)
 2008 Genie Award for Best Achievement in Overall Sound - Shake Hands with the Devil - Nominee (shared with Eric Fitz, Jocelyn Caron, Benoit Leduc)
 2007 Genie Award for Best Achievement in Overall Sound - Bon Cop, Bad Cop - Won (shared Dominique Chartrand, Nathalie Morin, Pierre Paquet)
 2007 Jutra Award for Best Sound (Meilleur Son) - Bon Cop, Bad Cop - Nominated (shared with Dominique Chartrand, Christian Rivest, Pierre Paquet)
 2005 Genie Award for Best Achievement in Overall Sound - The Last Tunnel (Le Dernier tunnel) - Won (shared with Dominique Chartrand, Pierre Paquet)
 2005 Genie Award for Best Achievement in Overall Sound - Head in the Clouds - Nominated (shared with Pierre Blain, Jocelyn Caron, Michel Descombes)
 2004 Genie Award for Best Achievement in Overall Sound - The Barbarian Invasions - Nominated (shared with Michel Descombes, Patrick Rousseau)
 2003 Genie Award Best Achievement in Overall Sound - Inside (Histoire de pen) - Nominated (shared with Bobby O'Malley, Philippe Pelletier)
 2003 Jutra Award for Best Sound (Meilleur Son) - Inside (Histoire de pen) - Nominated (shared with Bobby O'Malley, Denis Saindon, Philippe Pelletier)
 2003 Jutra Award for Best Sound (Meilleur Son) - Alice's Odyssey (L'Odyssée d'Alice Tremblay) - Nominated (shared with Yvon Benoît, Marie-Claude Gagné)
 2002 Jutra Award for Best Sound (Meilleur Son) - Wedding Night (Nuit de noces) - Nominated (shared with Claude Lahaie, Marie-Claude Gagné)
 2000 Genie Award for Best Overall Sound - The Last Breath (Le Dernier souffle) - Nominated (shared with Michel Descombes, Jocelyn Caron, Michel Charron)
 2000 Jutra Award for Best Sound (Meilleur Son) - The Last Breath (Le Dernier souffle) - Nominated (shared with Michel Charron, Jocelyn Caron, Bruno Ruffolo, Louis Dupire, Michel Descombes)
 1996 Genie Award for Best Achievement in Overall Sound - Black List (Liste noire) - Nominated (shared with Luc Boudrias, Daniel Masse, Michel Descombes)

External links 
 

Best Sound Genie and Canadian Screen Award winners
Year of birth missing (living people)
Living people
Place of birth missing (living people)